The Glendon Limestone is a geologic formation in Mississippi. It preserves fossils dating back to the Paleogene period.

See also
 List of fossiliferous stratigraphic units in Mississippi
 Paleontology in Mississippi

References

 

Paleogene Mississippi
Limestone formations of the United States